Robert Taylor (born Spangler Arlington Brugh; August 5, 1911 – June 8, 1969) was an American film and television actor and singer who was one of the most popular leading men of cinema.

Taylor began his career in films in 1934 when he signed with Metro-Goldwyn-Mayer. He won his first leading role the following year in Magnificent Obsession. His popularity increased during the late 1930s and 1940s with appearances in Camille (1936), A Yank at Oxford (1938), Waterloo Bridge (1940), and Bataan (1943). During World War II, he served in the United States Naval Air Forces, where he worked as a flight instructor and appeared in instructional films. From 1959 to 1962, he starred in the television series The Detectives Starring Robert Taylor. In 1966, he assumed hosting duties from his friend Ronald Reagan on the series Death Valley Days.

Taylor was married to actress Barbara Stanwyck from 1939 to 1952. He married actress Ursula Thiess in 1954, and they had two children. A chain smoker, Taylor died of lung cancer at the age of 57.

Early life
Taylor was born Spangler Arlington Brugh on August 5, 1911, in Filley, Nebraska, the only child of Ruth Adaline (née Stanhope) and Spangler Andrew Brugh, a farmer turned doctor. During his early life, the family moved several times, living in Muskogee, Oklahoma; Kirksville, Missouri; and Fremont, Nebraska. By September 1917, the Brughs had moved to Beatrice, Nebraska, where they remained for 16 years.

As a teenager, Taylor was a track and field star and played the cello in his high school orchestra. Upon graduation, he enrolled at Doane College in Crete, Nebraska. While at Doane, he took cello lessons from Professor Herbert E. Gray, whom he admired and idolized. After Professor Gray announced he was accepting a new position at Pomona College in Claremont, California, Taylor moved to California and enrolled at Pomona. He joined the campus theater company and was eventually spotted by an MGM talent scout in 1932 after a production of Journey's End.

Career
He signed a seven-year contract with Metro-Goldwyn-Mayer with an initial salary of $35 per week, which rose to $2500 by 1936. The studio changed his name to Robert Taylor. He made his film debut in the 1934 comedy Handy Andy, starring Will Rogers (on loan to Fox Studios). 

His first leading role came by accident. In 1934 Taylor was on the MGM payroll as "the test boy," a male juvenile who would be filmed opposite various young ingenues in screen tests. In late 1934, when MGM began production of its new short-subject series Crime Does Not Pay with the dramatic short Buried Loot, the actor who had been cast fell ill and could not appear. The director sent for the test boy to substitute for the missing actor. Taylor's dramatic performance, as an embezzler who deliberately disfigures himself to avoid detection, was so memorable that Taylor immediately was signed for feature films.

In 1935, Irene Dunne requested him for her leading man in Magnificent Obsession. This was followed by Camille with Greta Garbo.

Throughout the late 1930s, Taylor appeared in films of varying genres including the musicals Broadway Melody of 1936 and Broadway Melody of 1938, and the British comedy A Yank at Oxford with Vivien Leigh.  Throughout 1940 and 1941 he argued in favor of American entry into World War II, and was sharply critical of the isolationist movement.  During this time he said he was "100% pro-British". In 1940, he reteamed with Leigh in Mervyn LeRoy's drama Waterloo Bridge.

After being given the nickname "The Man with the Perfect Profile", Taylor began breaking away from his perfect leading man image and began appearing in darker roles beginning in 1941. That year he played the title role in Billy the Kid, followed by the same the next year in the film noir Johnny Eager with Lana Turner. After playing a tough sergeant in Bataan in 1943, Taylor contributed to the war effort by becoming a flying instructor in the U.S. Naval Air Corps. During this time, he also starred in instructional films and narrated the 1944 documentary The Fighting Lady.

After the war he appeared in a series of edgy roles, including the neo-noir Undercurrent (1946) and drama High Wall (1947). In 1949 he co-starred with Elizabeth Taylor in the suspense  Conspirator, which Hedda Hopper described as "another one of Taylor's pro-British films". Taylor responded to this by saying "And it won't be the last!"  However, both Hopper and Taylor were members of the anticommunist organization the Motion Picture Alliance for the Preservation of American Ideals, as were Taylor's friends John Wayne, Walt Disney and Gary Cooper. For this reason Hopper always spoke favorably of Taylor, despite him disagreeing with her over what she saw as his "Anglophilia" and what he saw as her "Anglophobia". In 1950, Taylor landed the role of General Marcus Vinicius in Quo Vadis with Deborah Kerr. The epic film was a hit, grossing US$11 million in its first run. The following year, he starred in the film version of Walter Scott's classic Ivanhoe, followed by 1953's Knights of the Round Table and The Adventures of Quentin Durward, all filmed in England.  Of the three only Ivanhoe was a critical and financial success. Taylor also filmed Valley of the Kings in Egypt in 1954.

By the mid-1950s, Taylor began to concentrate on westerns, his preferred genre. He starred in a comedy western Many Rivers to Cross in 1955 co-starring Eleanor Parker. In 1958, he shared the lead with Richard Widmark in the edgy John Sturges western The Law and Jake Wade. Also in 1958, he left MGM and formed Robert Taylor Productions, and the following year, he starred in the television series The Detectives Starring Robert Taylor (1959–1962). Following the end of the series in 1962, Taylor continued to appear in films and television shows, including A House Is Not a Home and two episodes of Hondo.

Robert Taylor received the 1953 World Film Favorite – Male, award at the Golden Globes (tied with Alan Ladd).

In 1964, Taylor co-starred with his former wife Barbara Stanwyck in William Castle's psychological horror film The Night Walker. In 1965, after filming Johnny Tiger in Florida, Taylor took over the role of narrator in the television series Death Valley Days when Ronald Reagan left to pursue a career in politics. Taylor would remain with the series until his death in 1969.

Taylor traveled to Europe to film Savage Pampas (1966), The Glass Sphinx (1967) and The Day the Hot Line Got Hot (1968).

Personal life

Marriages and children
After dating her for three years, Taylor married Barbara Stanwyck on May 14, 1939, in San Diego, California. Zeppo Marx's wife, Marion, was Stanwyck's matron of honor. Stanwyck's surrogate father—he was her sister Millie's husband—and personal assistant, vaudevillian Buck Mack, was Taylor's best man. Stanwyck divorced Taylor in February 1951. During the marriage, Stanwyck's adopted son from her previous marriage to Frank Fay,  Anthony "Tony" Dion, lived with them. After the divorce, Stanwyck retained custody of the child.

Taylor met German actress Ursula Thiess in 1952. They married in Jackson Hole, Wyoming, on May 23, 1954. They had two children, a son, Terrance, (1955) and a daughter, Tessa, (1959). Taylor was stepfather to Thiess' two children from her previous marriage, Manuela and Michael Thiess. On May 26, 1969, shortly before Taylor's death from lung cancer, Ursula Thiess found the body of her son, Michael, in a West Los Angeles motel room. He died from a drug overdose. One month before his death, Michael had been released from a mental hospital. In 1964, he spent a year in a reformatory for attempting to poison his father with insecticide.

Politics 

In February 1944, Taylor helped found the Motion Picture Alliance for the Preservation of American Ideals. In October 1947, Taylor was called to testify before the House Committee on Un-American Activities regarding Communism in Hollywood. He did this reluctantly, regarding the hearings as a "circus" and refusing to appear unless subpoenaed. In his testimony concerning the Screen Actors Guild (SAG), delivered on October 22, 1947, Taylor stated: "It seems to me that at meetings, especially meetings of the general membership of the Guild, there was always a certain group of actors and actresses whose every action would indicate to me that, if they are not Communists, they are working awfully hard to be Communists." Two people already under investigation by the FBI, Karen Morley and Howard Da Silva, were mentioned as troublemakers at SAG meetings. Taylor alleged that at meetings of the SAG, Da Silva "always had something to say at the wrong time." Da Silva was blacklisted on Broadway and New York radio, and Morley never worked again after her name surfaced at the hearings. Taylor went on to declare that he would refuse to work with anyone who was suspected of being a Communist: "I'm afraid it would have to be him or me because life is too short to be around people who annoy me as much as these fellow-travelers and Communists do". Taylor also labeled screenwriter Lester Cole "reputedly a Communist", adding "I would not know personally". After the hearings, Taylor's films were banned in Communist Hungary and in Czechoslovakia, and Communists called for a boycott of his films in France.  

In 1951, Taylor remarked "I speak out against communism now for the same reason I spoke out against Nazism a decade ago, because I am pro-freedom and pro-decency." He helped narrate the 1952 anticommunist public service documentary The Hoaxters, which compared the threat of international communism in the 1950s to the threat of Nazism in the 1930s and 1940s.

Taylor supported Barry Goldwater in the 1964 United States presidential election and Ronald Reagan in the 1966 California gubernatorial election.

Flying
In 1952, Taylor starred in the film Above and Beyond, a biopic of Enola Gay pilot Paul Tibbets. The two men met and found that they had much in common. Both had considered studying medicine, and were avid skeet-shooters and fliers. Taylor learned to fly in the mid-1930s, and served as a United States Navy flying instructor during World War II. His private aircraft was a Twin Beech called "Missy" (his then-wife Stanwyck's nickname) which he used on hunting and fishing trips and to fly to locations for filming.

Ranch
Taylor owned a 34-room house situated on  located in Mandeville Canyon in the Brentwood section of Los Angeles. Dubbed the Robert Taylor Ranch, the property was sold to KROQ-FM owner Ken Roberts in the 1970s. Roberts remodeled the home and put it back on the market in 1990 for $45 million. He later reduced the price to $35 million, but the ranch failed to attract a buyer. In 2010, the ranch was seized by New Stream Capital, a hedge fund, after Roberts failed to repay a high interest loan he had taken from them.

In November 2012, the Robert Taylor Ranch was put up for auction by the trust that owned it. It was purchased for $12 million by a Chicago buyer in December 2012.

Death
In October 1968, Taylor underwent surgery to remove a portion of his right lung after doctors suspected that he had contracted coccidioidomycosis (known as "valley fever"). During the surgery, doctors discovered that he had lung cancer. Taylor, who had smoked three packs of cigarettes a day since he was a boy, quit smoking shortly before undergoing surgery. During the final months of his life, he was hospitalized seven times due to infections and complications related to the disease. He died of lung cancer on June 8, 1969, at Saint John's Health Center in Santa Monica, California.

Taylor's funeral was held at Forest Lawn Memorial Park Cemetery, in Glendale, California. Long-time friend Ronald Reagan (who was then the governor of California) eulogized Taylor. Among the mourners were Robert Stack, Van Heflin, Eva Marie Saint, Walter Pidgeon, Keenan Wynn, Mickey Rooney, George Murphy, Audrey Totter and Taylor's ex-wife Barbara Stanwyck.

For his contribution to the motion picture industry, Robert Taylor has a star on the Hollywood Walk of Fame at 1500 Vine Street.

Filmography

Box-office ranking

1936 - 4th (US)
1937 - 3rd (US), 8th (UK)
1938 - 6th (US), 7th (UK)
1939 - 14th (US), 4th (UK)
1941 - 21st (US)

Radio appearances

References

Bibliography

 Alexander, Linda J. Reluctant Witness: Robert Taylor, Hollywood and Communism. Twentynine Palms, California: Tease Publishing, 2008. .
 Balio, Tino. The American Film Industry. Madison: University of Wisconsin Press, 1985. .
 Hall, Gladys. Robert Taylor's True Life Story. New York: Dell Publishing Co., 1937.
 Humphries, Reynold. Hollywood's Blacklists: A Political and Cultural History. Edinburgh: Edinburgh University Press, 2008. .
 Imwold, Denise, Andrew Brettell, Heather von Rohr and Warren Hsu Leonard.Cut!: Hollywood Murders, Accidents, and Other Tragedies. Hauppauge, New York: Barrons Educational Series, 2005. .
 Madsen, Axel. Stanwyck: A Biography. Lincoln, Nebraska: iUniverse, 2015. .
 Mayhew, Robert. Ayn Rand and Song of Russia: Communism and Anti-Communism in 1940s Hollywood. Lanham Maryland: Scarecrow Press, 2005. .
 Quirk, Lawrence J. The Films of Robert Taylor. New York: Lyle Stuart, 1979. .
 Ross, Steven J. Movies and American Society (Blackwell Readers in American Social and Cultural History). Chichester, West Sussex, UK: Wiley-Blackwell, 2002. .
 Slide, Anthony. Actors on Red Alert: Career Interviews with Five Actors and Actresses Affected by the Blacklist. Lanham Maryland: Scarecrow Press, 1999. .
 Tibbets, Paul W. Mission: Hiroshima. New York: Stein & Day, 1985. 
 
 Wayne, Jane Ellen. The Leading Men of MGM. New York: Carroll & Graf, 2005. .
 Wayne, Jane Ellen. The Life of Robert Taylor. New York: Warner Paperback Library, 1973. .

External links

 
 
  at the Nebraska State Historical Society
 Photographs of Robert Taylor
 
 Robert Taylor Actor
 Persons of Exceptional Prominence List (Official Military Personnel Files)  at the National Archives at St. Louis https://www.archives.gov/st-louis/military-personnel/public

1911 births
1969 deaths
20th-century American male actors
Male actors from Nebraska
American anti-communists
American male film actors
American male television actors
Burials at Forest Lawn Memorial Park (Glendale)
California Republicans
Deaths from lung cancer in California
Doane University alumni
Metro-Goldwyn-Mayer contract players
Pomona College alumni
People from Gage County, Nebraska
People from Mandeville Canyon, Los Angeles
People from Beatrice, Nebraska
United States Navy pilots of World War II